Andrew Logan may refer to:

People
Andrew Logan (sculptor) (born 1945), English artist
Andrew Logan (songwriter) (fl. 1990s–2000s), American songwriter
Andrew Logan (surgeon) (1906–2005), British surgeon

See also
Andy Logan (1918–1998), American football player